Binjiang Province (Chinese: 濱江省) was one of the provinces of Manchukuo. Binjiang was founded on December 1, 1934 and was dissolved in August 1945. Binjiang had a mix of Chinese, Korean, Japanese, and Russian people. Binjiang was created when the old Jilin Province was split into the Binjiang Province and Jiandao Province, and Jilin Province. In 1937 Binjiang Province was split into the Binjiang Province and Mudanjiang Province.

1934 
Binjiang Province was created in 1934, from the old Jillin province. In this year, many Japanese people moved to the area but during it, many human rights abuses happened.

1937 
Binjiang was split into the Binjiang and the Mudanjiang Province.

1945 
The Soviet invasion of Manchuria happened in 1945, Binjiang was also affected by it, and when Manchukuo and Japan surrendered, Binjiang was also officially dissolved.

Administrative divisions 
Before the fall of Manchukuo, Binjiang Province had 1 city, 16 counties, and 1 banner:

 Harbin City
 Acheng County
 Bin County
 Shuangcheng County
 Wuchang County
 Zhuhe County
 Weihe County
 Yanshou County
 Hulan County
 Bayan County
 Mulan County
 Zhaodong County
 Zhaozhou County
 Lanxi County
 Dongxing County
 Anda County
 Qinggang County
 Guoerluoshouqi

Governors 
Unless otherwise specified, according to sources.

 Lu Ronghuan : December 1, 1934 – May 21, 1935
 Han Yunjie : May 21, 1935 – May 25, 1935
 Yan Niansu : May 25, 1935 – July 1, 1937
 Shi Luben : July 1, 1937 – January 17, 1938
 Wei Huanzhang : February 10, 1938 – May 16, 1940
 Yu Jingtao : May 16, 1940 – April 20, 1943
 Wang Ziheng : April 20, 1943- (End of War)

Legacy 
Binjiang was one of the many provinces in Manchukuo with any human right abuses and genocide, causing this province to have a negative light in history by many, a small part of the reason of Chinese hatred of Japan

See also
 List of administrative divisions of Manchukuo

References

Provinces of Manchukuo